Sun Beau (1925 – c.1943) was an American Thoroughbred Champion Hall of Fame racehorse.

Background
Sun Beau was sired by Sun Briar. His damsire was Fair Play, who sired Man o' War.

Racing career
Racing as a two-year-old in 1927, Sun Beau developed slowly, winning only once in four starts. Trained by Charles W. Carroll, at age three,  he finished 11th in the 1928 Kentucky Derby and 5th in the Preakness Stakes under jockey John Craigmyle. However, Sun Beau began to show improvement and wound up the season with eight wins. At age four, the colt set a record for a 1¼ mile race while winning the first of three consecutive Hawthorne Gold Cup Handicaps at Hawthorne Race Course near Chicago. Several more important victories earned him the first of three straight U.S. Champion Older Male Horse titles.  At the end of his racing career, Sun Beau's total earnings were $376,744.

Sun Beau continued to race at ages five and six, winning nine races in each year, the most of any year he had raced. He retired as the all-time leader in race earnings. During his five-year career, he had eight trainers.

Stud record
Sun Beau was sent to stud duty at his owner's Remlik Farm near Urbanna, Virginia. He sired few stakes winners, none of which achieved his level of success. The last of his progeny was born in 1944. He died in 1943.

Honors
In 1996, Sun Beau was inducted into the National Museum of Racing and Hall of Fame.

References

1925 racehorse births
1943 racehorse deaths
Thoroughbred family 4-r
Racehorses bred in Virginia
Racehorses trained in the United States
Horse racing track record setters
United States Thoroughbred Racing Hall of Fame inductees